Van Rooyen's Gate is a Border Post located between South Africa and Lesotho.

References

Lesotho–South Africa border crossings